Nastra is a genus of skipper butterflies in the family Hesperiidae.

Species
Recognised species in the genus Nastra include:
 Nastra celeus (Mabille, 1891)
 Nastra chao (Mabille, 1898)
 Nastra ethologus (Hayward, 1934)
 Nastra julia (Freeman, 1945) - Julia's skipper 
 Nastra leucone (Godman, 1900)
 Nastra lherminier (Latreille, [1824]) - Swarthy Skipper
 Nastra nappa (Evans, 1955)
 Nastra neamathla (Skinner and Williams, 1923) - Neamathla Skipper
 Nastra perigenes (Godman, 1900)
 Nastra subsordida (Mabille, 1891)

References

Natural History Museum Lepidoptera genus database

Hesperiinae
Hesperiidae genera